Rudolf Närjänen (March 31, 1941 – February 26, 2009) was a Finnish sprint canoer who competed in the mid-1960s. He finished ninth in the C-2 1000 m event at the 1964 Summer Olympics in Tokyo.

References
Sports-reference.com profile

1941 births
2009 deaths
People from Lomonosovsky District, Leningrad Oblast
Canoeists at the 1964 Summer Olympics
Finnish male canoeists
Olympic canoeists of Finland